The Free State of Coburg (German: Freistaat Coburg) emerged from the Duchy of Saxe-Coburg and Gotha at the end of the First World War.  It existed from November 1918 until its union with the Free State of Bavaria on 1 July 1920.

History
With the abdication of the reigning duke, Charles Edward, on 14 November 1918, the Duchy of Saxe-Coburg and Gotha ended in the wake of the November Revolution. It split into two Free States – , from the Duchy of Saxe-Gotha in the north, and Coburg, from the Duchy of Saxe-Coburg in the south. Both states kept their own diets and ministers, which they had inherited from the former monarchy. On 9 February 1919, elections were held for the eleven seats in the State Assembly of Coburg. The List I of the Social Democratic Party of Germany (SPD) received 58.6 percent, while the List II for the National Liberal Party, German Democratic Party (DDP) and the Coburger Farmers Party earned 41.4 percent. That meant the SPD would have seven seats, leaving the remaining four to the others. The President of the State Assembly would be a Social Democratic, Erhard Kirchner. The State Assembly passed on 10 March 1919 the "Temporary Law of the Legislation and Administration of the Free State of Coburg" [Vorläufiges Gesetz über die Gesetzgebung und Verwaltung im Freistaate Coburg], the Provisional Constitution of Coburg. The government would be run by the three-member State Council, consisting of Hermann Quarck (National Liberal, previously the leader of the Ministerial Cabinet of Coburg) as the Chairman and two SPD deputies, Franz Klingler and Reinhold Artmann.  The separation of the two parts of the former Duchy was finally complete on 12 April 1919, when a state treaty covering the management of the common administration of the Free States of Coburg and Gotha was signed.

On 7 June 1919 Duke Charles Edward finalized the settlement with the Free State of Coburg over his properties and compensation.  He received 1.5 million Marks as his compensation for his following properties – approximately 4,500 hectares (11,120 acres) of forests, numerous buildings and individual properties as well as the art treasures of the Veste Coburg, the Veste's courtyard garden museum, his personal library, the Ducal Theater, Schloss Rosenau and its estate, the Veste Coburg, the Schloss Ehrenburg, and the State Archives of Coburg. The art treasures of the Veste, the collections of the courtyard museums and the furnishing of Schloss Ehrenburg would be the property of the Coburger Landesstiftung (Coburg State Foundation), while the rest would go to the Free State. Schloss Callenberg, with its estate and gardens, Schloss Eichhof, and the Schweizerei Rosenau all remained the property of the duke with the total area of 533 hectares (1,317 acres).

The National Liberal Quarck, according to the Constitution of 10 March 1919, held the most senior position in the government and administration.  He was both the Chairman of the State Government and the Head of the Department of State. After the SPD fraction, which had the majority in the State Assembly, named Reinhold Artmann to represent Coburg in the State Council of Thuringia (Board of Directors for the Law Enforcement), he rejoined Quarck in their offices on 2 July 1919.  This was followed on 11 July 1919 by a constitutional amendment that abolished the personal union of the State Council and Assembly. Franz Klingler was then named as the new Chairman of the State Government and Hans Schack (DDP) became the newest member of the State Council of Coburg. The leadership of the Ministry was given to Ernst Fritsch, an administrative lawyer, with the official title of Secretary.

Since the political leaders did not consider the new Free State as economically viable, they sought a union with another state. It was therefore assumed in March and May 1919 that the conferences with other Thuringian states would create the state of Thuringia but, ultimately, they did not result in an agreement that would please all the sides.  Along with these conferences, official negotiations for a possible merger began with Bavaria in the middle of June and with Prussia one month later. However, Prussia had already declined the proposed union as early as August. But Bavaria was receptive to the merger.  Unlike the State of Thuringia, it was able to make many concessions, especially on the matter of the preservation of the cultural institutions of Coburg.

On 30 November 1919, the first democratic referendum in Germany was finally held to determine the future of the Coburger Land.  With a turnout of about 70%, 88% of the population voted on the question, “Soll Coburg dem Gemeinschaftsvertrag der thüringischen Staaten beitreten? [Should Coburg join the Communal Treaty of the Thuringian States]?” with a No on the ballot and therefore for the merger with Bavaria. The reasons for this clear-cut result were manifold. On the one hand, the people had always seen themselves more strongly associated with Franconia than with Thuringia. On the other hand, they were influenced by the fact that, during the First World War, food had to be sent to Thuringia, as well as by their significantly stronger accommodation with the views of Bavaria.

With a new state treaty signed on 14 February 1920, the union of Coburg with Bavaria was set. In it, Coburg was given financial guarantees for its State Foundation, its agricultural and forestry trade associations, its Chamber of Commerce, from which the Chamber of Trades section became the new Chamber of Trades, the State Hospital and the Landestheater Coburg. In addition, Coburg received as its compensation for the loss of the State Ministry the commitment for a new regional court of law. The Free State of Bavaria was, therefore, committing itself to undertake the maximum of 40% of the deficit of the Landestheater Coburg and 75% of the State Hospital.

Therefore, with the union of the Free States of Coburg and Bavaria on 1 July 1920, almost 600 years of political autonomy of the Coburger Land came to an end. According to the State Treaty, the Free State of Coburg would be assigned to the (Kreis, now Regierungsbezirk [administrative district] of Upper Franconia (Oberfranken). The district of Königsberg with the town of Königsberg, as well as the communities of Altershausen, Dörflis, Erlsdorf, Hellingen, Kottenbrunn and Nassach, were sent to the district (Bezirk, now Landkreis) of Hofheim in Lower Franconia (Unterfranken).

The Referendum of 1919 and the subsequent union with Bavaria had unexpected consequences in 1945 at the end of the Second World War. The territory of the former Free State of Coburg now became a part of the American Occupation Zone of Germany, while the Thuringian side stayed in the Soviet Occupation Zone and later East Germany until 1990.

Politics

State Government
In office from 10 March 1919 to 1 July 1920
 Reinhold Artmann (1870 – 1960) (SPD)
 Franz Xavier Klingler (1875 – 1933) (SPD)
 [Carl] Hermann Quarck (1873 – 1932) (National Liberal), until 8 July 1919
 Hans Woldemar Schack (1878 – 1946) (DDP), after 11 July 1919

Deputies of the State Assembly
Social Democratic Party of Germany (SDP):
 Reinhold Artmann (1870 – 1960) from Coburg, carpenter
 Erhard Kirchner (1866 – 1927) from Neustadt bei Coburg, manager at Allgemeine Ortskrankenkasse [General Local Health Insurance] (AOK)  and President of the State Assembly
 Franz Xavier Klingler (1875 – 1933) from Coburg, editor of the newspaper, the Coburger Volksblatt [Coburger People's Bulletin]
 Bernhard Lauer (1867 – 1927) from Neustadt bei Coburg, employee at AOK 
 Hermann Mämpel (1866 – 1944) from Coburg, administrative assistant at AOK
 Johann Stegner (1866 – 1954) from Frohnlach, brewer and innkeeper
 Carl Wendt (1887 – 1936) from Rodach, machinist

Other Parties and Independents:
 Max Oscar Arnold (1854 – 1938) from Neustadt bei Coburg, manufacturer of dolls
 Hans Woldemar Schack (1878 – 1946) from Coburg, Judge of the District Courts
 Ernst Külbel (1863 – 1938) from Coburg, maltmaker
 Gustav Hess (1874 – 1940) from Neuses bei Coburg, farmer

Towns and communities
 4 towns: Coburg (capital), Neustadt bei Coburg, Rodach bei Coburg, Königsberg
 139 communities: Ahlstadt, Ahorn, Aicha, Beiersdorf, Bertelsdorf, Beuerfeld, Bieberbach, Birkach am Forst, Birkig, Blumenrod, Boderndorf, Breitenau, Brüx, Buchenrod, Callenberg, Cortendorf, Creidlitz, Dörfles, Drossenhausen, Ebersdorf bei Coburg, Ebersdorf bei Neustadt, Einberg, Elsa, Esbach, Fechheim, Fischbach, Fornbach, Friesendorf, Frohnlach, Fürth am Berg, Gauerstadt, Gestungshausen, Gossenberg, Grattstadt, Großgarnstadt, Großheirath, Großwalbur, Grub am Forst, Haarbrücken, Haarth, Hassenberg, Heldritt, Herbartsdorf, Höhn, Hof an der Steinach, Horb an der Steinach, Horb bei Fürth am Berg, Kemmaten, Ketschenbach, Ketschendorf, Kipfendorf, Kleingarnstadt, Kleinwalbur, Kösfeld, Lempertshausen, Leutendorf, Lützelbuch, Mährenhausen, Meeder, Meilschnitz, Meschenbach, Mirsdorf, Mittelberg, Mittelwasungen, Mödlitz, Mönchröden, Moggenbrunn, Neida, Neukirchen, Neuses am Brand, Neuses an den Eichen, Neuses bei Coburg, Neu- und Neershof, Niederfüllbach, Oberfüllbach, Oberlauter, Obersiemau, Oberwasungen, Oberwohlsbach, Oeslau, Oettingshausen, Ottowind, Plesten, Rögen, Rohrbach, Rossach, Rossfeld, Roth am Forst, Rothenhof, Rottenbach, Rudelsdorf, Rüttmannsdorf, Schafhof, Scherneck, Scheuerfeld, Schönstädt, Schweighof, Seidmannsdorf, Sonnefeld, Spittelstein, Steinach an der Steinach, Stöppach, Sulzdorf, Sülzfeld, Thann, Tiefenlauter, Tremersdorf, Trübenbach, Unterlauter, Untersiemau, Unterwasungen, Unterwohlsbach, Waldsachsen, Waltersdorf, Watzendorf, Weickenbach, Weidach, Weidhausen bei Coburg, Weimersdorf, Weischau, Weißenbrunn am Forst, Weißenbrunn vorm Wald, Weitramsdorf, Wellmersdorf, Wiesenfeld, Wildenheid, Wörlsdorf, Wohlbach, Wüstenahorn, Zedersdorf, Zeickhorn, Ziegelsdorf
 Enclave of the District of Königsberg: Communities of Altershausen, Dörflis, Erlsdorf, Hellingen, Köslau, Kottenbrunn and Nassach.

References

Bibliography
 	 Harald Bachmann, “75 Jahre Coburg bei Bayern” [“Coburg’s 75 Years with Bavaria”], in: Frankenland. Zeitschrift für fränkische Landeskunde und Kulturpflege 1995 [Franconia:  Journal of Cultural Studies and Preservation 1995], Heft [Issue] 3, ISSN 0015-9905, p. 143–150 (PDF; 1,56 MB).
 	 Carl-Christian Dressel, Die Bestimmungen des Staatsvertrags. Entwicklung, Hintergründe, Folgen - unter besonderer Berücksichtigung der Leistung von Franz Klingler [The Provisions of the Treaty:  Development, Background, Consequences – with Special Emphasis on the Performance of Franz Klingler], Thesis in History, Gymnasium Casimirianum Coburg, Class Years of 1987–1989 (Coburg:  Author, 1989)
 	 Jürgen Erdmann, Coburg, Bayern und das Reich 1918–1923 [Coburg, Bavaria and the Empire 1918–1923] (Coburg:  Druckhaus und Vesteverlag [Printing and Publishing House of] A. Rossteutscher, 1969), (Coburger Heimatkunde und Landesgeschichte Reihe 2, 22 [Coburger Studies of State and Local History Series 2, Nr 22], ZDB-ID 1151614-8) (simultaneously:  University of Würzburg, Dissertation, 1969:  Coburg in den Anfangsjahren der Weimarer Republik 1918–1923 [Coburg in the Beginning of the Weimar Republic Years 1918–1923])
 	 Rainer Hambrecht, ed., Nicht durch Krieg, Kauf oder Erbschaft [Not by War, Sale or Inheritance]: Ausstellung des Staatsarchivs Coburg anlasslich der 75. Wiederkehr der Vereinigung Coburgs mit Bayern am 1. Juli 1920 [Catalogue of the Exhibition at the State Archives of Coburg for the 75th Anniversary of the Union of Coburg with Bavaria on 1 July 1920] (München:  Staatlichen Archive Bayern [Bavarian State Archives], 1995).
 	 Esther Reinhart, Max Oscar Arnold (1854-1938). Leben und Wirken für das Coburger Land [Life and Work for the Coburger Land] (Coburg:  Historische Gesellschaft [Historical Society of] Coburg, 2007), (Schriftenreihe der Historischen Gesellschaft Coburg e.V., 21 Band [Series of the Historical Society of Coburg, Inc., Volume 21).
 	 Harald Sandner, Coburg im 20. Jahrhundert. Die Chronik über die Stadt Coburg und das Haus Sachsen-Coburg und Gotha vom 1. Januar 1900 bis zum 31. December 1999 – von der „guten alten Zeit“ bis zur Schwelle des 21. Jahrhunderts. Gegen das Vergessen [Coburg in the 20th Century:  The Chronicle of the City of Coburg and the House of Saxe-Coburg and Gotha from 1 January 1900 to 31 December 1999 – from the “Good Old Days” to the Dawn of the 21st Century.  Lest We Forget] (Coburg:  Verlagsanstalt Neue Presse [New Press Publishing Co.], 2002), 
 	 Jörg Siegmund, “Zwischen Konsens und Blockadepolitik. Die Übergangsparlamente in Sachsen-Gotha und Sachsen-Coburg” [“Between Consensus and Obstructionism:  The Transitional Parliament in Saxe-Gotha and Saxe-Coburg”], in: Harald Mittelsdorf (ed.): Die vergessenen Parlamente. Landtage und Gebietsvertretungen in den Thüringer Staaten und Gebieten 1919 bis 1923 [The Forgotten Parliaments:  State Parliaments and Regional Representation in the Thuringian States and Territories from 1919 to 1923], Herausgegeben vom Thüringer Landtag [Publication of the State Parliament of Thuringia] (Rudolstadt, Germany:  Verlag Hain, 2002), (Schriften zur Geschichte des Parlamentarismus in Thüringen [Writings on the History of Parliamentarianism in Thuringia] 19), p. 121–160.

External links
  Rainer Hambrecht, "Freistaat Coburg, 1918-1920" ["Free State of Coburg, 1918–1920"], in: Historisches Lexikon Bayerns [Historical Dictionary of Bavaria], 25 March 2013, retrieved on 9. August 2013.
  Rainer Hambrecht,  "Vereinigung Coburgs mit Bayern, 1. Juli 1920" ["Union of Coburg with Bavaria, 1 July 1920"], in: Historisches Lexikon Bayerns [Historical Dictionary of Bavaria], 8 April 2011, retrieved on 9 August 2013.
  Der Staatsvertrag zwischen den Freistaaten Bayern und Coburg über die Vereinigung Coburgs mit Bayern  [The State Treaty between the Free States of Bavaria and Coburg concerning the Union of Coburg with Bavaria] (PDF, 97 KB)

States and territories established in 1918
1918 establishments in Germany
States of the Weimar Republic
Former states and territories of Bavaria
South Thuringia
History of Franconia